The H family is a line of automobile 60° V6 engines from Suzuki. It was co-developed with Mazda and Toyota, which used a similar design in their 2.0 L KF V6 and the Toyota VZ engine. The H family was introduced in 1994 with the H20, but Suzuki, Toyota and Mazda's designs diverged greatly with the former increasing displacement and the latter experimenting with alternative induction technologies and smaller engine sizes.

H20A

Applications:
 1994–1999 Suzuki Escudo/Vitara

H25A

It is also being considered and used for various ultra-light aircraft propulsion systems.

Applications:
 1996–2005 Suzuki Escudo/Vitara Wagon/Estate (LWB) **not in Australia
 1998–2005 Suzuki Grand Vitara(Only US and Canada)
 2001-2004 Chevrolet Tracker
 Titan T-51 Mustang

H27A

The H27A is a modern version of the H25A, a reliable motor displacing , coming from an  bore and stroke (VVT added in 2006). The engine is tuned to achieve most of its torque at low revs at the expense of raw power at high revs, making the engine very responsive in day-to-day driving.

Applications:

2000 - 2009 XL-7
2006 - 2008 Grand Vitara (only in North American markets)
Titan T-51 Mustang homebuilt airplane

See also
 List of Suzuki engines

References

H
V6 engines
Gasoline engines by model